Max Avery Lichtenstein is an American record producer, composer and songwriter based in North Salem, New York. He's produced records with such artists as Mercury Rev, Hopewell and The Silent League. He composed the soundtrack for Jonathan Caouette's movie Tarnation and for the 2005 James Bai film Puzzlehead.

Works

References

External links
Official Website
Myspace Blog
Released free download of Tarnation

Record producers from New York (state)
Living people
Year of birth missing (living people)
Place of birth missing (living people)
People from North Salem, New York
Musicians from New York (state)